Michaela Meijer (born 30 July 1993) is a Swedish athlete who specialises in the pole vault. She competed at the 2015 World Championships in Beijing, reaching the final. In 2016, Meijer competed at the Olympic Games in Rio de Janeiro, but was eliminated in the qualification round, finishing 17th with 4.45 meters. In addition she won silver medals at the 2009 World Youth Championships and the 2015 European U23 Championships, both times finishing behind her compatriot, Angelica Bengtsson. Her personal bests in the event are 4.83 metres outdoors (Norrköping, 2020), which is also the Swedish record and 4.75 metres indoors (Bærum 2019).

Competition record

(q = qualification round)

References

External links
 

1993 births
Living people
Swedish female pole vaulters
World Athletics Championships athletes for Sweden
Athletes from Gothenburg
Athletes (track and field) at the 2016 Summer Olympics
Olympic athletes of Sweden
Athletes (track and field) at the 2020 Summer Olympics